Politics of Nature: How to Bring the Sciences Into Democracy (2004) is a book by the French theorist and philosopher of science Bruno Latour. The book is an English translation by Catherine Porter of the French book, Politiques de la nature. It is published by Harvard University Press.

Overview
In the book, Latour argues for a new and better take on political ecology (not the discipline but the ecological political movements, e.g. greens) that embraces his feeling that, "political ecology has nothing to do with nature". In fact, Latour argues that the idea of nature is unfair because it unfairly allows those engaged in political discourse to "short-circuit" discussions. Latour uses Plato's metaphor of "the cave" to describe the current role of nature and science in separating facts from values which is the role of politics and non-scientists. Building on the arguments levelled in his previous works, Latour argues that this distinction between facts and values is rarely useful and in many situations dangerous. He claims that it leads to a system that ignores nature's socially constructed status and creates a political order without "due process of individual will".

Instead, he calls for a "new Constitution" where different individuals can assemble democratically without the definitions of facts and values influenced by current attitudes towards nature and scientific knowledge. Latour describes an alternate set of rules by which this assembly, or collective as he calls it, might come together and be constituted. He also describes the way that entities will be allowed in or out in the future. In describing this collective, Latour draws attention to the role of the spokesperson, who must be doubted but who must speak for otherwise mute things in order to ensure that the collective involves both "humans and non-humans". This is also an important aspect of Actor-network theory (ANT) that can be found in his main sociological works.

The book includes a short summary at the end and a glossary of terms.

Reviews of the book 
Sal Restivo emphasises that the book is reproducing the insights from Science Studies, which Bruno Latour himself has greatly contributed to. However, Sal Restivo questions whether Latour understood social constructivism and what sociologists actually do.

See also 
 Laboratory life (with Steve Woolgar)
 Science in Action (book)
 Aramis, or the Love of Technology
 We Have Never Been Modern

References

External links
 Introduction on Latour's website

2004 non-fiction books
Political books
Sociology of scientific knowledge
Science and technology studies works
Works by Bruno Latour